The Osh Regional Committee of the Communist Party of Kirghizia, commonly referred to as the Osh CPK obkom, was the authority in the Osh region in the Kirghiz Soviet Socialist Republic. The position was created in 1939, and abolished on 25 August 1991. The First Secretary was considered the de facto governor of the Minsk region. The First Secretary was appointed by the Politburo.

List of First Secretaries of the Regional Committee

See also 
Communist Party of the Soviet Union
Communist Party of Kirghizia
Osh Region

References 

Kirghiz Soviet Socialist Republic
Osh Region
Regional Committees of the Communist Party of the Soviet Union
1939 establishments in the Soviet Union
1991 disestablishments in the Soviet Union